Tetris Battle Gaiden is a puzzle video game developed and published in 1993 by Bullet Proof Software for the Super Famicom. Released only in Japan, the game is a variant of the Tetris series involving multiplayer battles comparable to those of the Puyo Puyo and Columns series of video games.

References 

1993 video games
Blue Planet Software games
Japan-exclusive video games
Multiplayer and single-player video games
Super Nintendo Entertainment System games
Super Nintendo Entertainment System-only games
Tetris
Video games developed in Japan